Ewald Constantin Ferdinand Friedrich von Lochow (1 April 1855 in Petkus – 11 April 1942 in Berlin-Charlottenburg) was a Prussian officer and later General of Infantry during World War I. He was a recipient of Pour le Mérite with Oakleaves.

Awards
 Iron Cross II Class (1914)
 Iron Cross I Class (1914)
 Pour le Mérite (14 January 1915) and Oakleaves (13 November 1915)
 Order of the Crown
 Order of the Zähringer Lion
 Order of Albert the Bear
 Hanseatic Cross Lübeck
 Order of the Red Eagle
 Bavarian Military Merit Order
 Albert Order
 Württemberg Order of the Crown
 Friedrich Order

References

1855 births
1942 deaths
People from Teltow-Fläming
Generals of Infantry (Prussia)
Recipients of the Pour le Mérite (military class)
Recipients of the Iron Cross (1914), 1st class
People from the Province of Brandenburg
Grand Crosses of the Military Merit Order (Bavaria)
Commanders of the Order of Franz Joseph
Recipients of the Order of Saint Stanislaus (Russian), 3rd class
Recipients of the Hanseatic Cross (Lübeck)
Grand Officers of the Order of Military Merit (Bulgaria)
Commanders of the Order of Saints Maurice and Lazarus
Recipients of the Order of the Rising Sun